The Hare Mail is a 1931 short animated film by Walter Lantz Productions, and among the many featuring Oswald the Lucky Rabbit. The film is also one of the few where Mickey Rooney voiced the title character.

Plot
Oswald is on the streets selling newspapers. Suddenly he hears a distress call coming from a nearby house.

Oswald comes to the house, and peeps through a window. Inside he sees a large turbulent bear interrogating a small living doll about the money's location. When the doll refuses to tell, the bear turns to an old lynx who is the doll's "maternal grandfather." Oswald tries to intervene, only to be easily pushed aside. And when the lynx also refuses, the bear ties the doll onto a lumber which is then placed to be sliced by a buzz saw. The lynx finally gives in, and the bear immediately finds a sack of cash hidden within that feline. The lynx then asks the bear to release the doll but the bear just thinks it would be pleasant to have her halved as the canine flees. Oswald returns to the house with a group of cops but the bear has already gone. Instead, the rabbit stops the buzz saw and unties the doll.

The bear attempts to leave using a nearby aircraft. Though the plane takes off, Oswald is able to grab onto its tail. The bear, who aware of his presence, tries to separate Oswald by removing the plane's tail but Oswald manages to build another plane with it. The bear then drops a sack onto Oswald's plane which is full of primates. The primates, however, teamed with Oswald to get back at the bear. Upon returning to the bear's plane, Oswald and the primates manage to dispose the bear and recover the loot. When Oswald jumps to return to the ground, troubles are not over for him as his parachute refuses to deploy.

The doll and the lynx spot Oswald in the sky. They then use the lynx's long beard to cushion his fall. Oswald and the doll give each other a smooch.

References

External links
The Hare Mail at the Big Cartoon Database

1931 films
1931 animated films
1930s American animated films
1930s animated short films
American black-and-white films
Films directed by Walter Lantz
Oswald the Lucky Rabbit cartoons
Universal Pictures animated short films
American aviation films
Walter Lantz Productions shorts
Films about aviators
Animated films about cats
Animated films about dogs
Films about dolls
Films about sentient toys